The second season of the American television series Whose Line Is It Anyway? premiered on ABC on September 16, 1999, and concluded on May 18, 2000.

Cast

Recurring 
 Brad Sherwood (11 episodes)
 Greg Proops (10 episodes)
 Chip Esten (eight episodes)
 Denny Siegel (four episodes)
 Josie Lawrence (two episodes)
 Kathy Greenwood (two episodes)
 Karen Maruyama (two episodes)

Episodes 

"Winner(s)" of each episode as chosen by host Drew Carey are highlighted in italics. The winner would take his or her seat and call a sketch for Drew to perform (often with the help of the rest).

References

External links
Whose Line Is It Anyway? (U.S.) (a Titles & Air Dates Guide)
Mark's guide to Whose Line is it Anyway? - Episode Guide

Whose Line Is It Anyway?
1999 American television seasons
2000 American television seasons